Victor Otto Stomps-Preis is a literary prize of Germany. Victor Otto Stomps, VauO, was a German publisher and writer.

References

German literary awards